VV Kloetinge is a football club from Kloetinge, Netherlands.

History
The club was founded in 1931 under the name Unitas. The name was changed to Kloetinge in 1952. Some years later, the club colours were changed from blue and black to green and white. Kloetinge is a stable Saturday Eerste Klasse between 2015 and 2022. In 2022, it won an Eerste Klasse section championship and promoted to the Vierde Divisie.

References

External links
 

Football clubs in the Netherlands
Football clubs in Goes
Association football clubs established in 1931
1931 establishments in the Netherlands